Domasławice may refer to the following places in Poland:
Domasławice, Lower Silesian Voivodeship (south-west Poland)
Domasławice, West Pomeranian Voivodeship (north-west Poland)